Jessica Samuelsson may refer to:

Jessica Samuelsson (heptathlete) (born 1985), Swedish heptathlete
Jessica Samuelsson (footballer) (born 1992), Swedish footballer